Jelena Žnidarić (born 9 June 1994), known professionally as Zsa Zsa, is a Croatian singer. She rose to fame by participating in the second season of X Factor Adria. Zsa Zsa is most known for her collaboration with Damir Kedžo on the song "Sve u meni se budi".

Life and career

Early life and career beginnings
Jelena Žnidarić was born in Pušćine, Croatia. Žnidarić began singing at an early age. At age five her parents enrolled her in singing lessons.

Breakthrough
In 2015 Žnidarić released her first single "Živa sam". "Sve u meni se budi", a collaboration with Croatian singer Damir Kedžo was released as Žnidarić's second single. Žnidarić and Kedžo took part with the song at the 54th edition of Zagrebački festival and won the contest with 144 points. Commercially, the song was a success in Croatia. On the HR Top 40 Year-end Chart of 2017, the song was declared the number one song, a career first for both Žnidarić and Kedžo.

Discography

Singles

References

External links

People from Međimurje County
21st-century Croatian women singers
Living people
1994 births
Croatian pop singers